Warren Douglas Chamberlain (February 2, 1927 – October 4, 2013) was an American lawyer and politician.

Born in Washington Township, Marion County, Iowa, Chamberlain served in the United States Navy during World War II. He then went to Marquette University, Northern State University, and received his law degree from William Mitchell College of Law. Chamberlain practiced law in Faribault, Minnesota and served as city attorney and municipal court judge. From 1967 to 1973, Chamberlain served in the Minnesota House of Representatives. He died at his home in Fairbault, Minnesota.

Notes

1927 births
2013 deaths
People from Marion County, Iowa
People from Faribault, Minnesota
Military personnel from Iowa
Marquette University alumni
Northern State University alumni
William Mitchell College of Law alumni
Minnesota lawyers
Members of the Minnesota House of Representatives
20th-century American lawyers